Evst (Topmost) is the first full-length album by the Faroese doom metal band Hamferð. It was released on October 11, 2013, in the Faroe Islands via Tutl.

Reception
In a positive review, the Sonic Seducer noted the album's mix of melancholic doom metal and clean song and instrumental parts.

Track listing

Personnel
Hamferð
 Jón Aldará – Vocals
 John Áki Egholm – Guitars
 Theodor Kapnas – Guitars
 Esmar Joensen – Keyboards
 Jenus Í Trøðini – Bass
 Remi Kofoed Johannesen – Drums

Additional musicians and production
 Eivør Pálsdóttir – vocals on Sinnisloysi
 Seismic audio arrangement –  ORKA with Jens L. Thomsen, Uni Árting and Theodor Kapnas
 Production, engineering and mixing – Theodor Kapnas
 Mastering – Tony Lindgren
 Reamping of distorted guitars – Greg Tomao
 Artwork – Jón Sonni Jensen

References

2013 albums
Hamferð albums